Karakalpak is a Turkic language spoken by Karakalpaks in Karakalpakstan. It is divided into two dialects, Northeastern Karakalpak and Southeastern Karakalpak. It developed alongside Uzbek and neighboring Kazakh languages, being markedly influenced by both. Typologically, Karakalpak belongs to the Kipchak branch of the Turkic languages, thus being closely related to and highly mutually intelligible with Kazakh.

Classification
Karakalpak is a member of the Kipchak branch of Turkic languages, which includes Kazakh, Bashkir, Tatar, Kumyk, Karachay, Nogai and Kyrgyz. Due to its proximity to Uzbek, much of Karakalpak's vocabulary and grammar has been influenced by Uzbek. Like the vast majority of Turkic languages, Karakalpak has vowel harmony, is agglutinative and has no grammatical gender. Word order is usually subject–object–verb.

Geographic distribution
Karakalpak is spoken mainly in the Karakalpakstan Autonomous Republic of Uzbekistan. Approximately 2,000 people in Afghanistan and smaller diaspora in parts of Russia, Kazakhstan, Turkey and other parts of the world speak Karakalpak.

Official status
Karakalpak has official status in the Karakalpakstan Autonomous Republic.

Dialects
Ethnologue identifies two dialects of Karakalpak: Northeastern and Southwestern. Menges mentions a third possible dialect spoken in the Fergana Valley.  The Southwestern dialect has /tʃ/ for the Northeastern /ʃ/.

Phonology
Karakalpak has 25 native consonant phonemes and regularly uses four non-native phonemes in loan words.  Non-native sounds are shown in parentheses.

Consonants

Vowels

Vowel harmony

Vowel harmony functions in Karakalpak much as it does in other Turkic languages.  Words borrowed from Russian or other languages may not observe rules of vowel harmony, but the following rules usually apply:

Vocabulary

Personal pronouns

Numbers
 bir 1
 eki 2
 úsh 3
 tórt 4
 bes 5
 altı 6
 jeti 7
 segiz 8
 toǵız 9
 on 10
 júz 100
 mıń 1000

Writing system

Karakalpak was written in the Arabic and Persian script until 1928, in the Latin script (with additional characters) from 1928 to 1940, after which Cyrillic was introduced. Following Uzbekistan's independence in 1991, the decision was made to drop Cyrillic and revert to the Latin alphabet. Whilst the use of Latin script is now widespread in Tashkent, its introduction into Karakalpakstan remains gradual.

The Cyrillic and Latin alphabets are shown below with their equivalent representations in the IPA. Cyrillic letters with no representation in the Latin alphabet are marked with asterisks. The last changes to the new Karakalpak alphabet were made in 2016: instead of letters with apostrophes, letters with acutes were introduced. Therefore, the new Karakalpak alphabet will act in the same way the new Kazakh and Uzbek alphabets represent – that is, with acutes.

Before 2009, C was written as TS; I and Í were written as dotted and dotless I.

Poets 
 Ájiniyaz
 Berdax G'arg'abay Ulí
 Kúnxoja
 Ibrayim Yusupov

See also

References

Bibliography

 
 

Agglutinative languages
Languages of Kazakhstan
Languages of Russia
Languages of Uzbekistan
Turkic languages of Afghanistan
Turkic languages
Kipchak languages